Tres Ríos is a district of the La Unión canton, in the Cartago province of Costa Rica.

Toponymy 
Tres Ríos is translated as Three Rivers, named so due to the confluence of Tiribí, Chiquito and Cruz rivers.

History

In pre-Columbian times, this area, now in the canton of La Unión, was inhabited by the indigenous Huetares, in the Eastern Huetar Kingdom, ruled over by chief El Guarco. By the time the Spanish Empire arrived, the main chief of the region was Guarco's son, Correque.

In the eighteenth century, some parish priests from the Church of the Holy Spirit of Esparza, accompanied by natives of Salamanca, were heading to the city of Cartago. On their way they traveled through the valley of Tres Ríos, as it was called at that time. They settled there, thus giving rise to a more stable population.

They built a small chapel that was dedicated to the Our Lady of the Pillar, whose image had been given to them by Bishop Heredia.

Geography 
Tres Ríos has an area of  km² and an elevation of  metres.

Education 
Tres Ríos has one school, the

Demographics 

According to the 2011 census, Tres Ríos had a population of  inhabitants.

Transportation

Road transportation 
The district is covered by the following road routes:
 National Route 2
 National Route 202
 National Route 221
 National Route 251
 National Route 409

Rail transportation 
The district is covered by the passenger Interurbano Line operated by Incofer. There is an unmanned platform stop in the north of the district, at Plaza Barcelona shopping center.

Economy

Coffee
Tres Ríos, particularly its surroundings, is one of the eight recognized coffee production areas in the country. The regional coffee flavor is associated with high the local soils' fertility and composition, which have been enriched by minerals in the various eruptions of Irazú Volcano (which last erupted in 1963) and to an ideal balance of moisture from rains and warm summers.

Due to dynamic urban growth in the metropolitan area of Costa Rica in the late twentieth century, the land use has progressively changed from agricultural to suburban, forcing the elimination of dozens of coffee farms. However, the Tres Rios area, particularly neighboring districts of Concepción and San Ramón, both also in La Unión, still continue to grow coffee beans for the gourmet market.

The economy of Tres Rios is now diversified and no longer depends only on the cultivation of coffee. Urban development and geographical location close to other densely populated metropolitan suburbs and midway between the cities of San José and Cartago have oriented its economy to trade and services, including the development of many private schools.

External links
 Official site of the Civic Movement Association of La Unión Canton

References 

Districts of Cartago Province
Populated places in Cartago Province